unDeveloped is the fourth studio album by electro-industrial band ohGr.

Track listing
From Metropolis Records

Personnel
From unDeveloped liner notes
 Ogre - vocals, instrumentals
 Mark Walk - instrumentals, production
 Ken Marshall - additional mixings, writing, mastering and production
 Steven R. Gilmore - sleeve design

Notes
 Track 13 includes the song "Welcome to Collidoskope" as a hidden track.  "Welcome to Collidoskope" begins at the 4:58 mark.
 "Crash (Intro)" and "Crash", tracks 3 and 4 respectively, include the actual audio from the 911 call reporting Michael Jackson's death.

References

External links
ohGr Official Facebook Profile

2011 albums
OhGr albums
Metropolis Records albums